A trimaran (or double-outrigger) is a multihull boat that comprises a main hull and two smaller outrigger hulls (or "floats") which are attached to the main hull with lateral beams. Most modern trimarans are sailing yachts designed for recreation or racing; others are ferries or warships. They originated from the traditional double-outrigger hulls of the Austronesian cultures of Maritime Southeast Asia; particularly in the Philippines and Eastern Indonesia, where it remains the dominant hull design of traditional fishing boats. Double-outriggers are derived from the older catamaran and single-outrigger boat designs.

Terminology 
The word "trimaran" is a portmanteau of "tri" and "(cata)maran", a term that is thought to have been coined by Victor Tchetchet, a pioneering, Ukrainian-born modern multihull designer. Trimarans consist of a main hull connected to outrigger floats on either side by a crossbeam, wing, or other form of superstructure—the traditional Polynesian terms for the hull, each float and connector are vaka, ama and aka, respectively (although trimarans are not traditionally Polynesian, since they instead use single-outrigger and catamaran configurations).

Sailing trimarans

History 

The first double-outrigger boats were developed by the Austronesian people and are still widely used today by traditional fishermen in maritime Southeast Asia. It developed from the more ancient single-outrigger boats as a way to deal with the problem of the instability of the latter when tacking leeward. Double-outrigger boats, however, did not develop among Austronesians in Micronesia and Polynesia (although it exists in western Melanesia), where single-outrigger boats and catamarans are used instead.

Warships with double-outriggers were used widely in Maritime Southeast Asia since ancient times up until the early modern period, with examples like the karakoa, lanong kora kora, knabat bogolu, and the Borobudur ships . These were often referred to by Europeans during the colonial era as "proas", a general term which can also refer to single-outriggers and even to native ships without outriggers.

20th century 
Recreational sailing catamarans and trimarans gained popularity during the 1960s and 1970s. He is credited with coining the term, "trimaran." In the 1950s and 60s, Arthur Piver designed and built plywood kit trimarans, which were adopted by other homebuilders, but were heavy and not sea-kindly by modern standards. Some of these achieved ocean crossings, nonetheless. Other designers followed, including Jim Brown, Ed Horstman, John Marples, Jay Kantola, Chris White, Norman Cross, Derek Kelsall and Richard Newick, thus bringing the trimaran cruiser to new levels of performance and safety.

Following the homebuilt movement, production models became available. These include the original Farrier – Corsair folding trimarans, such as the F-27 Sport Cruiser – and original John Westell swing-wing folding trimaran (using the same folding system later adopted also on Quorning Dragonfly) and like trimarans.

Modern western-built trimarans typically do not use Austronesian rigging like tanja or crab claw sails. Instead they use a standard Bermuda rig. Trimarans are also typically significantly wider. In addition, trimaran floats are much more buoyant than those of outrigger canoes to support a large sailplan. They contribute to drag when heavily immersed, and their level of immersion indicates when to reef. In terms of performance, an objective comparison by Doran (1972) in terms of maximum progress against the wind, maximum speed, and speed downwind concluded that both the traditional double-outrigger vinta of the Philippines and the single-outrigger wa of the Caroline Islands, respectively, are still superior to the modern trimaran.

Folding trimarans 

Several manufacturers build trimarans in which the floats can be removed, repositioned, or folded near to the main hull. This allows them to be trailerable and/or to fit in a normal monohull space in a marina. Several mechanisms allow the amas or outriggers to be stored compactly:

 Demountable fixed tubes that are assembled before launching.
 Telescoping tubes
 Hinge and latch system that allows the amas to fold over the main hull to reduce width for trailing.
 Vertical folding that lifts the amas upwards and over the main hull.
 Horizontal articulation that moves the amas forward or backwards at the same level as the hull.
 Horizontal folding of the amas towards the main hull.

Safety 

Trimaran safety features include amas with multiple sealed partitions, controls that all run to the cockpit, a collision bulkhead, partial or full cockpit coverings or windshields, and drain holes in the cockpit that can adequately drain the cockpit quickly, among other things.

Trimaran capsizes are more likely to be of the pitchpole type than a roll to one side due to their higher sideways stability and speeds. Capsized trimarans are harder to turn upright after they have turtled than monohull boats. While some capsized trimarans righted by sideways rotation may suffer heavy damage to mast and rigging, many modern and ancient trimarans are explicitly designed for this method of righting. Harnesses pulling on the stern toward the bow, or from the bow toward the stern of capsized trimarans have been shown to be able to successfully turn them end-over-end. Several design features reduce the chance of pitch-pole capsize; these include having wing nets with an open weave designed to reduce windage and decks and nets that shed water easily. The best way to avoid capsize is to reduce sail in heavy weather.

Competition and records 
Thomas Coville holds the world record of 49 days and 3 hours for sailing solo around the world in the trimaran Sodebo Ultim, finishing on December 25, 2016. The previous record was set by Francis Joyon on January 20, 2008. The 51-year-old Frenchman circled the planet alone in 57 days, 13 hours, 34 minutes, 6 seconds in a trimaran. He beat British sailor Ellen MacArthur's record set in February 2005 for which she spent just over 71 days at sea.

Francis Joyon and a crew of five in the maxi trimaran IDEC SPORT set the absolute (wind or mechanically powered) time for the fastest maritime circumnavigation, in 40 days 23 hours 30 minutes 30 seconds of sailing between Dec 2016 and Jan 2017. In early 2020, the same boat won a race retracing the tea clipper route from Hong Kong to London in just under 32 days – one-third the time it took the clippers to sail the route.

Hydroptère, an experimental sailing hydrofoil trimaran, briefly reached  near Fos-sur-Mer, but capsized and turtled shortly thereafter.

33rd America's Cup 

Competing with a giant trimaran the BMW Oracle Racing team won the 2010 America's Cup for the Golden Gate Yacht Club on February 14, 2010, off Valencia, Spain. The team beat the giant catamaran Alinghi 2–0 in the best-of-three series, becoming the first American syndicate to win the cup since 1992. The large rigid wing sail of the USA 17 trimaran provided a decisive advantage and the trimaran won the America's Cup by a considerable margin in each race.

Powerboat 
Earthrace broke the world record for circumnavigating the globe in a motorized boat in 2008 in just under 61 days.

Trimaran ships 
The trimaran configurations has also been used for both passenger ferries and warships. The Australian shipbuilding company, Austal, investigated the comparative merits of trimaran ships, catamarans and monohulls. It found that there was an optimum location for the outer hulls in terms of minimizing wave generation and consequent power requirements for operating at high speeds with a payload of 1,000 tonnes. It further found that such a trimaran configuration was superior to a catamaran for roll and lateral force in a beam sea and superior in suppressing motion sickness resulting from a head sea.

The negative considerations for trimarans, compared with catamarans or monohulls are:

 A more complicated and consequently more expensive hull structure for the payload, making them more suited for low-density cargo or passengers.
 More complicated geometry and large size per unit of cargo carried, which makes docking more difficult than for a catamaran or monohull.
Between 2005 and 2020, Austal had built 14 aluminum high-speed trimaran ships, 11 of which were for the US Navy. In 2020, they had 11 trimarans under construction or under order. In addition to shipyards in Australia and the US, the company had shipyards in Vietnam and the Philippines.

In 2005 Austal delivered the  Benchijigua Express to Spanish ferry operator Fred Olsen, S.A. for service in the Canary Islands. Capable of carrying 1,280 passengers and 340 cars, or equivalents, at speeds up to 40 knots, this boat was the longest aluminum ship in the world at the time of delivery. A modern warship, the RV Triton was commissioned by British defence contractor QinetiQ in 2000. In October 2005, the United States Navy commissioned for evaluation the construction of a General Dynamics litoral combat ship trimaran designed and built by Austal.

High-speed ferries 

High-speed craft are governed by a code that applies to those designed for international passenger voyages that are shorter than four hours from a port of refuge, or cargo craft of 500 gross tonnage no more than eight hours from a port of refuge. All passengers are provided with a seat and there are no enclosed sleeping berths.

The demand for high-speed ferries started in the late 1970s for ferries built mostly in Norway. Ultimately, two Australian shipyards came to prominence, Incat and Austal. They were initially built by many shipyards, but by the turn of the century only two companies were still building larger vessels of over 70 metres and 3,000 Gross Tons. While Incat has specialized in wave-piercing catamarans, Austal has developed high-speed trimarans.

In 2010 Austal built the 102 metre Hull 270, although they were unable to find a buyer for the ship until it was sold to Condor Ferries in 2015 when it was named HSC Condor Liberation and began operating to the Channel Islands. Prospects for trimaran ferries picked up in 2017 when Fred. Olsen Express ordered two 118-metre trimarans for their Canary Islands services, named Bajamar Express and Bañaderos Express. In 2018 a Japanese company ordered an 83 metre trimaran ferry.

Naval ships 

The first use of trimaran hull designs in modern navies was in the RV Triton, a Research Vessel for the Royal Navy. She was built as a technology demonstrator ship for the Royal Navy's Future Surface Combatant, and has been used to prove the viability of the hull form. Since 2007 the ship has been used by the Australian Customs and Border Protection Service's Customs Marine Unit.

Littoral combat ships built by General Dynamics at Bath Iron Works are of a trimaran design. USS Independence (LCS-2) is the first of these ships. Littoral combat ships built by Lockheed are of a monohull design.

First launched on August 31, 2012, at Bali Strait, 63M Carbon Fibre Composite Trimaran Fast Missile Boat (Indonesian: Kapal Cepat Rudal [KCR]) named Klewang-class fast attack craft (Klewang- means a traditional Indonesian single edge sword), was the first stealth trimaran of the Indonesian Navy built by North Sea Boats at Banyuwangi, East Java, Indonesia. This ship combined a number of existing advance technologies into a single, unique platform; a wave-piercer trimaran hull from, constructed exclusively of infused vinylester carbon fibre cored sandwich materials for all structural elements, with external "stealth" geometry and features intended to reduce detection. The KRI Klewang (625) caught fire because of an electrical short-circuit in the engine room during a maintenance period on September 28, 2012, and was a total loss.

43-meter Ocean Eagle  trimarans from CMN wharf with design from Nigel Irens und Prolarge based on the Ocean Adventurer concept will provide coastal protection for Mozambique.

Image gallery sailing trimarans

Image gallery engine driven trimarans

See also 
 List of multihulls
 Bangka
 Catamaran
 Multihull
 Sailing
 Turtling (sailing)

Notes

References

External links 
A sailing community for enthusiasts of small trimarans

 
Boat types
Multihulls
Sailboat types
Ship types
Outrigger canoes